The following is a list of most watched television broadcasts in the United States based on average viewership and household ratings measurement conducted by Nielsen. The Super Bowl has frequently been the most watched American television broadcast of the year. The Apollo 11 Moon Landing was the most watched U.S. television event in history drawing nearly 150 million viewers.

Most watched broadcasts of all time 

Of the 30 most-watched broadcasts, 22 are Super Bowls, four are news events, three are primetime television programs, and one is a non-football related sports event. Though the Apollo 11 Moon landing is the most watched television event in American history, it is considered a news event, meaning that NBC's live telecast of Super Bowl XLIX in 2015 holds the record for the largest average viewership of any live single network U.S. television broadcast, with 114.4 million viewers. The most watched primetime programs (non Super Bowl related) are the finale of M*A*S*H  in 1983 (106 million viewers), Roots ("Part VIII"), The Day After (tied at 100 million), Leon Spinks vs. Muhammad Ali II (90 million), Dallas's 1980 "Who Done It" episode (83.6 million), the 1993 series finale of Cheers (80.5 million), the February 23, 1994, broadcast of ladies' singles figure skating at the 1994 Winter Olympics (78.8 million), and the Seinfeld finale in 1998 (76.3 million).

The following is the list of the all-time most watched television broadcasts in the United States by average viewership, according to the Nielsen ratings:

Series by year

{| class="wikitable" style="text-align:center; font-size:90%;"
|-
! rowspan="2" style="width:9%;" | Season 
! colspan="4" style="width:34%;" | Live
! colspan="3" style="width:28%;" | Live + 3 DVR 
! colspan="3" style="width:28%;" | Live + 7 DVR 
|-
! style="width:15%;" | Series 
! style="width:5%;" | Network
! style="width:7%;" | Households(millions)
! style="width:7%;" | Viewers(millions)
! style="width:15%;" | Series
! style="width:5%;" | Network
! style="width:7%;" | Viewers(millions)
! style="width:15%;" | Series 
! style="width:5%;" | Network
! style="width:7%;" | Viewers(millions)
|-
| colspan="11" 
|-
| 1950–1951
| Texaco Star Theatre
| NBC
| 6.28
| 
| 
| 
| 
| 
| 
| 
|-
| 1951–1952
| Arthur Godfrey's Talent Scouts
| rowspan="9" | CBS
| 8.23
| 
| 
| 
| 
| 
| 
| 
|-
| 1952–1953
| rowspan="3" | I Love Lucy
| 13.73
| 
| 
| 
| 
| 
| 
| 
|-
| 1953–1954
| 15.29
| 
| 
| 
| 
| 
| 
| 
|-
| 1954–1955
| 15.14
| 
| 
| 
| 
| 
| 
| 
|-
| 1955–1956
| The $64,000 Question
| 16.58
| 
| 
| 
| 
| 
| 
| 
|-
| 1956–1957
| I Love Lucy
| 17.00
| 
| 
| 
| 
| 
| 
| 
|-
| 1957–1958
| rowspan="3" | Gunsmoke
| 18.07
| 
| 
| 
| 
| 
| 
| 
|-
| 1958–1959
| 17.40
| 
| 
| 
| 
| 
| 
| 
|-
| 1959–1960
| 18.44
| 
| 
| 
| 
| 
| 
| 
|-
| colspan="11" 
|-
| 1960–1961
| Gunsmoke
| CBS
| 17.61
| 
| 
| 
| 
| 
| 
| 
|-
| 1961–1962
| Wagon Train
| NBC
| 15.59
| 
| 
| 
| 
| 
| 
| 
|-
| 1962–1963
| rowspan="2" | The Beverly Hillbillies
| rowspan="2" | CBS
| 18.11
| 
| 
| 
| 
| 
| 
| 
|-
| 1963–1964
| 20.18
| 
| 
| 
| 
| 
| 
| 
|-
| 1964–1965
| rowspan="3" | Bonanza
| rowspan="3" | NBC
| 19.13
| 
| 
| 
| 
| 
| 
| 
|-
| 1965–1966
| 17.12
| 
| 
| 
| 
| 
| 
| 
|-
| 1966–1967
| 16.04
| 
| 
| 
| 
| 
| 
| 
|-
| 1967–1968
| The Andy Griffith Show
| CBS
| 15.64
| 
| 
| 
| 
| 
| 
| 
|-
| 1968–1969
| rowspan="2" | Rowan & Martin's Laugh-In
| rowspan="2" | NBC
| 18.52
| 
| 
| 
| 
| 
| 
| 
|-
| 1969–1970
| 15.39
| 
| 
| 
| 
| 
| 
| 
|-
| colspan="11" 
|-
| 1970–1971
| Marcus Welby, M.D.
| ABC
| 17.79
| 
| 
| 
| 
| 
| 
| 
|-
| 1971–1972
| rowspan="5" | All in the Family
| rowspan="5" | CBS
| 21.11
| 
| 
| 
| 
| 
| 
| 
|-
| 1972–1973
| 21.58
| 
| 
| 
| 
| 
| 
| 
|-
| 1973–1974
| 20.65
| 
| 
| 
| 
| 
| 
| 
|-
| 1974–1975
| 20.69
| 
| 
| 
| 
| 
| 
| 
|-
| 1975–1976
| 20.95
| 
| 
| 
| 
| 
| 
| 
|-
| 1976–1977
| Happy Days
| rowspan="3" | ABC
| 22.43
| 
| 
| 
| 
| 
| 
| 
|-
| 1977–1978
| rowspan="2" | Laverne & Shirley
| 23.04
| 
| 
| 
| 
| 
| 
| 
|-
| 1978–1979
| 22.72
| 
| 
| 
| 
| 
| 
| 
|-
| 1979–1980
| 60 Minutes
| CBS
| 21.67
| 
| 
| 
| 
| 
| 
| 
|-
| colspan="11" 
|-
| 1980–1981
| rowspan="2" | Dallas
| rowspan="4" | CBS
| 27.57
| 
| 
| 
| 
| 
| 
| 
|-
| 1981–1982
| 23.15
| 
| 
| 
| 
| 
| 
| 
|-
| 1982–1983
| 60 Minutes
| 21.24
| 
| 
| 
| 
| 
| 
| 
|-
| 1983–1984
| Dallas
| 21.54
| 
| 
| 
| 
| 
| 
| 
|-
| 1984–1985
| Dynasty
| ABC
| 21.23
| 
| 
| 
| 
| 
| 
| 
|-
| 1985–1986
| rowspan="5" | The Cosby Show
| rowspan="5" | NBC
| 28.95
| 
| 
| 
| 
| 
| 
| 
|-
| 1986–1987
| 30.50
| 
| 
| 
| 
| 
| 
| 
|-
| 1987–1988
| 
| 
| 
| 
| 
| 
| 
| 
|-
| 1988–1989
| 23.14
| 
| 
| 
| 
| 
| 
| 
|-
| rowspan="2" | 1989–1990
| rowspan="2" | 21.28
| 
| 
| 
| 
| 
| 
| 
|-
| Roseanne
| ABC
| 
| 
| 
| 
| 
| 
| 
|-
| colspan="11" 
|-
| 1990–1991
| Cheers
| NBC
| 19.83
| 
| 
| 
| 
| 
| 
| 
|-
| 1991–1992
| rowspan="3" | 60 Minutes
| rowspan="3" | CBS
| 20.17
| 
| 
| 
| 
| 
| 
| 
|-
| 1992–1993
| 20.39
| 
| 
| 
| 
| 
| 
| 
|-
| 1993–1994
| 19.69
| 
| 
| 
| 
| 
| 
| 
|-
| rowspan="2"| 1994–1995
| Home Improvement
| ABC
| 
| 32.50
| 
| 
| 
| 
| 
| 
|-
| Seinfeld
| rowspan="5"| NBC
| 19.56
| 
| 
| 
| 
| 
| 
| 
|-
| 1995–1996
| rowspan="2" | ER
| 21.10
| 32.00
| 
| 
| 
| 
| 
| 
|-
| 1996–1997
| 20.56
| 30.79
| 
| 
| 
| 
| 
| 
|-
| 1997–1998
| Seinfeld
| 21.27
| 34.10
| 
| 
| 
| 
| 
| 
|-
| 1998–1999
| ER
| 17.69
| 25.40
| 
| 
| 
| 
| 
| 
|-
| 1999–2000
| Who Wants to Be a Millionaire (Tues)
| ABC
| 
| 28.53
| 
| 
| 
| 
| 
| 
|-
| colspan="11" 
|-
| 2000–2001
| Survivor
| CBS
| 28.80
| 29.80
| 
| 
| 
| 
| 
| 
|-
| 2001–2002
| Friends
| NBC
| 22.30
| 24.50
| 
| 
| 
| 
| 
| 
|-
| 2002–2003
| CSI: Crime Scene Investigation
| CBS
| 
| 26.12
| 
| 
| 
| 
| 
| 
|-
| 2003–2004
| rowspan="3" | American Idol (Tues)
| rowspan="7" | Fox
| 
| 25.73
| 
| 
| 
| 
| 
| 
|-
| 2004–2005
| 
| 27.32
| 
| 
| 
| 
| 
| 
|-
| 2005–2006
| 
| 31.17
| 
| 
| 
| 
| 
| 
|-
| 2006–2007
| American Idol (Wed)
| 
| 30.58
| 
| 
| 
| 
| 
| 
|-
| 2007–2008
| American Idol (Tues)
| 
| 28.80
| 
| 
| 
| 
| 
| 
|-
| 2008–2009
| American Idol (Wed)
| 
| 25.53
| 
| 
| 
| American Idol (Wed)
| rowspan="2" | Fox
| 26.88
|-
| 2009–2010
| American Idol (Tues)
| 
| 22.97
| 
| 
| 
| American Idol (Tues)
| 24.71
|-
| colspan="11" 
|-
| 2010–2011
| American Idol (Wed)
| Fox
| 
| 23.95
| 
| 
| 
| American Idol (Wed)
| Fox
| 26.20
|-
| 2011–2012
| rowspan="9" | NBC Sunday Night Football
| rowspan="9" | NBC
| 
| 
| 
| 
| 
| NBC Sunday Night Football
| NBC
| 20.74
|-
| 2012–2013
| 
| 
| 
| 
| 
| NCIS{{efn-ua|NBC Sunday Night Football aired three broadcasts before the official start of 2012–2013 television season which are not counted in the rankings. If these broadcasts were counted, NBC Sunday Night Football would average 21.44 million viewers—more than NCIS.}}
| rowspan="2"| CBS
| 21.34
|-
| 2013–2014
| 
| 21.42
| 
| 
| 
| The Big Bang Theory| 23.10
|-
| 2014–2015
| 
| 20.69
| 
| 
| 
| rowspan="3" | NBC Sunday Night Football| rowspan="3" | NBC
| 20.81
|-
| 2015–2016
| 
| 21.30
| rowspan="2" | NBC Sunday Night Football| rowspan="2" | NBC
| 21.38
| 21.39
|-
| 2016–2017
| 
| 19.63
| 19.73
| 19.75
|-
| 2017–2018
| 
| 17.58
| Roseanne| ABC
| 18.21
| Roseanne| ABC
| 19.96
|-
| 2018–2019
| 
| 18.80
| NBC Sunday Night Football| NBC
| 18.92
| rowspan="2"|NBC Sunday Night Football| rowspan="2"|NBC
| 18.94
|-
| 2019–2020
| 
| 19.96
| 
| 
| 
| 20.09
|-
|}

 The highest-rated broadcasts of all time 
The highest-rated broadcast of all time is the final episode of M*A*S*H'' in 1983, with 60.2% of all households with television sets in the United States at that time watching the episode. Aside from Super Bowls, the most recent broadcast to receive a rating above 40 was the Seinfeld finale in 1998, with a 41.3.

Nielsen only began recording a list of ratings for individual broadcasts starting in July 1960, therefore ratings before that time are not included in their official count.

Timeline 
The following is a timeline of the highest rated television broadcasts since December 17, 1960.

Series by year
The following is a list of the highest rated television series by year.

See also
List of most-watched television broadcasts

Notes

References

American television-related lists
Top television lists